Dame Jean Iris Murdoch  (15 July 1919 – 8 February 1999) was an Irish and British novelist and philosopher. Murdoch is best known for her novels about good and evil, sexual relationships, morality, and the power of the unconscious. Her first published novel, Under the Net (1954), was selected in 1998 as one of Modern Library's 100 best English-language novels of the 20th century. Her 1978 novel The Sea, the Sea won the Booker Prize. In 1987, she was made a Dame by Queen Elizabeth II for services to literature. In 2008, The Times ranked Murdoch twelfth on a list of "The 50 greatest British writers since 1945".

Her other books include The Bell (1958), A Severed Head (1961), The Red and the Green (1965), The Nice and the Good (1968), The Black Prince (1973), Henry and Cato (1976), The Philosopher's Pupil (1983), The Good Apprentice (1985), The Book and the Brotherhood (1987), The Message to the Planet (1989), and The Green Knight (1993).

As a philosopher, her best known work is The Sovereignty of Good (1970).

Life
Murdoch was born in Phibsborough, Dublin, Ireland, the daughter of Irene Alice (née Richardson, 1899–1985) and Wills John Hughes Murdoch. Her father, a civil servant, came from a mainly Presbyterian sheep farming family from Hillhall, County Down. In 1915, he enlisted as a soldier in King Edward's Horse and served in France during the First World War before being commissioned as a Second lieutenant. Her mother had trained as a singer before Iris was born, and was from a middle-class Church of Ireland family in Dublin. Iris Murdoch's parents first met in Dublin when her father was on leave and were married in 1918. Iris was the couple's only child. When she was a few weeks old the family moved to London, where her father had joined the Ministry of Health as a second-class clerk. She was a second cousin of the Irish mathematician Brian Murdoch.

Murdoch was brought up in Chiswick and educated in progressive independent schools, entering the Froebel Demonstration School in 1925 and attending Badminton School in Bristol as a boarder from 1932 to 1938. In 1938, she went up to Somerville College, Oxford, with the intention of studying English, but switched to "Greats", a course of study combining classics, ancient history, and philosophy. At Oxford she studied philosophy with Donald M. MacKinnon and attended Eduard Fraenkel's seminars on Agamemnon. She was awarded a first-class honours degree in 1942. After leaving Oxford she went to work in London for HM Treasury.  In June 1944, she left the Treasury and went to work for the UNRRA. At first she was stationed in London at the agency's European Regional Office. In 1945, she was transferred first to Brussels, then to Innsbruck, and finally to Graz, Austria, where she worked in a refugee camp. She left the UNRRA in 1946.

From 1947 to 1948, Iris Murdoch studied philosophy as a postgraduate at Newnham College, Cambridge. She met Ludwig Wittgenstein at Cambridge but did not hear him lecture, as he had left his Trinity College professorship before she arrived. In 1948 she became a fellow of St Anne's College, Oxford, where she taught philosophy until 1963. 
From 1963 to 1967, she taught one day a week in the General Studies department at the Royal College of Art.

In 1956, Murdoch married John Bayley, a literary critic, novelist, and from 1974 to 1992 Warton Professor of English at Oxford University, whom she had met in Oxford in 1954. The unusual romantic partnership lasted more than forty years until Murdoch's death. Bayley thought that sex was "inescapably ridiculous". Murdoch in contrast had "multiple affairs with both men and women which, on discomposing occasions, [Bayley] witnessed for himself". Notably she had a long and turbulent love relationship with writer Brigid Brophy.

Iris Murdoch's first novel, Under the Net, was published in 1954. She had previously published essays on philosophy, and the first monograph about Jean-Paul Sartre published in English. She went on to produce 25 more novels and additional works of philosophy, as well as poetry and drama. In 1976 she was named a Commander of the Order of the British Empire and in 1987 was made a Dame Commander of the Order of the British Empire. She was awarded honorary degrees by Durham University (DLitt, 1977), the University of Bath (DLitt, 1983), University of Cambridge (1993) and Kingston University (1994), among others. She was elected a Foreign Honorary Member of the American Academy of Arts and Sciences in 1982.

Her last novel, Jackson's Dilemma, was published in 1995. Iris Murdoch was diagnosed with Alzheimer's disease in 1997 and died in 1999 in Oxford. There is a bench dedicated to her in the grounds of Lady Margaret Hall, Oxford, where she used to enjoy walking.

Work

Philosophy
For some time, Murdoch's influence and achievements as a philosopher were eclipsed by her success as a novelist, but recent appraisals have increasingly accorded her a substantial role in postwar Anglo-American philosophy, particularly for her unfashionably prescient work in moral philosophy and her reinterpretation of Aristotle and Plato. Martha Nussbaum has argued for Murdoch's "transformative impact on the discipline" of moral philosophy because she directed her analysis not at the once-dominant matters of will and choice, but at those of attention (how people learn to see and conceive of one another) and phenomenal experience (how the sensory "thinginess" of life shapes moral sensibility).

In a recent survey of Murdoch's philosophical work, Justin Broackes points to several distinctive features of Murdoch's moral philosophy, including a "moral realism or 'naturalism', allowing into the world cases of such properties as humility or generosity; an anti‐scientism; a rejection of Humean moral psychology; a sort of 'particularism'; special attention to the virtues; and emphasis on the metaphor of moral perception or 'seeing' moral facts." The reasons for this are unclear, but the Scottish literary critic, G. S. Fraser notes that, in the late 1940s, the philosophers who were then occupying Murdoch's attention were late Victorian British idealists, such as T. H. Green, F. H. Bradley, and Bernard Bosanquet. Broackes also notes that Murdoch's influence on the discipline of philosophy was sometimes indirect, since it impacted both her contemporaries and the following generation of philosophers, particularly Elizabeth Anscombe, Philippa Foot, John McDowell, and Bernard Williams. She sent copies of her earlier novels to Anscombe, but there is nothing in Anscombe's writing which reflects any of these.

Her philosophical work was influenced by Simone Weil (from whom she borrows the concept of 'attention'), and by Plato, under whose banner she claimed to fight. In re-animating Plato, she gives force to the reality of the Good, and to a sense of the moral life as a pilgrimage from illusion to reality.  From this perspective, Murdoch's work offers perceptive criticism of Kant, Sartre and Wittgenstein ('early' and 'late').  Her most central parable, which appears in The Sovereignty of Good, asks us (in Nussbaum's succinct account), "to imagine a mother-in-law, M, who has contempt for D, her daughter-in-law. M sees D as common, cheap, low. Since M is a self-controlled Englishwoman, she behaves (so Murdoch stipulates) with perfect graciousness all the while, and no hint of her real view surfaces in her acts. But she realizes, too, that her feelings and thoughts are unworthy, and likely to be generated by jealousy and an excessively keen desire to hang on to her son. So she sets herself a moral task: she will change her view of D, making it more accurate, less marred by selfishness. She gives herself exercises in vision: where she is inclined to say 'coarse,' she will say, and see, 'spontaneous.' Where she is inclined to say 'common,' she will say, and see, 'fresh and naive.' As time goes on, the new images supplant the old. Eventually M does not have to make such an effort to control her actions: they flow naturally from the way she has come to see D." This is how M cultivates a pattern of behavior that leads her to view D "justly or lovingly".  The parable is partly meant to show (against Oxford contemporaries including R. M. Hare and Stuart Hampshire) the importance of the "inner" life to moral action.  Seeing another correctly can depend on overcoming jealousy, and discoveries about the world involve inner work.

Fiction
Her novels, in their attention and generosity to the inner lives of individuals, follow the tradition of novelists like Dostoyevsky, Tolstoy, George Eliot, and Proust, besides showing an abiding love of Shakespeare.   There is however great variety in her achievement, and the richly layered structure and compelling realistic comic imagination of  The Black Prince (1973) is very different from the early comic work Under the Net (1954) or The Unicorn (1963). The Unicorn can be read as a sophisticated Gothic romance, or as a novel with Gothic trappings, or perhaps as a parody of the Gothic mode of writing. The Black Prince, for which Murdoch won the James Tait Black Memorial Prize, is a study of erotic obsession, and the text becomes more complicated, suggesting multiple interpretations, when subordinate characters contradict the narrator and the mysterious "editor" of the book in a series of afterwords. Though her novels differ markedly, and her style developed, themes recur.  Her novels often include upper-middle-class male intellectuals caught in moral dilemmas, gay characters, refugees, Anglo-Catholics with crises of faith, empathetic pets, curiously "knowing" children and sometimes a powerful and almost demonic male "enchanter" who imposes his will on the other characters—a type of man Murdoch is said to have modelled on her lover, the Nobel laureate Elias Canetti.

Murdoch was awarded the Booker Prize in 1978 for The Sea, the Sea, a finely detailed novel about the power of love and loss, featuring a retired stage director who is overwhelmed by jealousy when he meets his erstwhile lover after several decades apart.  An authorised collection of her poetic writings, Poems by Iris Murdoch, appeared in 1997, edited by Paul Hullah and Yozo Muroya. Several of her works have been adapted for the screen, including the British television series of her novels An Unofficial Rose and The Bell. J. B. Priestley's dramatisation of her 1961 novel A Severed Head starred Ian Holm and Richard Attenborough.

In 1997, she was awarded the Golden PEN Award by English PEN for "a Lifetime's Distinguished Service to Literature".

Literary critics and theorists have given her mixed reviews. Harold Bloom wrote in his 1986 review of The Good Apprentice that "no other contemporary British novelist" seemed of her "eminence". A. S. Byatt called her "a great philosophical novelist". James Wood wrote in How Fiction Works: "In her literary and philosophical criticism, she again and again stresses that the creation of free and independent characters is the mark of a great novelist; yet her own characters never have this freedom." He stressed that some authors, "like Tolstoy, Trollope, Balzac and Dickens", wrote about people different from themselves by choice, whereas others, such as "James, Flaubert, Lawrence, Woolf", have more interest in the self. Wood called Murdoch "poignant", because she spent her whole life in writing in the latter category, while she struggled to fit herself into the former. In an assessment of  her Booker Prize-winning novel The Sea, the Sea, Sam Jordison, creator of the poll Crap Towns, declared that the book contained "scenes of absurd melodrama" and "mystical bollocks'". He did, however, praise Murdoch's comic set pieces, and her portrayal of self-deceit.

Political views
Murdoch won a scholarship to study at Vassar College in the US in 1946, but was refused a visa because she had joined the Communist Party of Great Britain in 1938, while a student at Oxford. She left the party in 1942, when she went to work at the Treasury, but remained sympathetic to communism for several years. In later years she was allowed to visit the United States, but always had to obtain a waiver from the provisions of the McCarran Act, which barred Communist Party members and former members from entering the country.  In a 1990 Paris Review interview, she said that her membership of the Communist Party had made her see "how strong and how awful it [Marxism] is, certainly in its organized form".

Aside from her Communist Party membership, her Irish heritage is the sensitive aspect of Murdoch's political life that seems to attract interest.  Part of the interest revolves around the fact that, although Irish by both birth and traced descent on both sides, Murdoch did not display the full set of political opinions that are sometimes assumed to go with this origin: "No one ever agrees about who is entitled to lay claim to Irishness.  Iris's Belfast cousins today call themselves British, not Irish... [but] with both parents brought up in Ireland, and an ancestry within Ireland both North and South going back three centuries, Iris has as valid a claim to call herself Irish as most North Americans have to call themselves American".  Conradi notes  record that Murdoch regretted the sympathetic portrayal of the Irish nationalist cause she had given earlier in The Red and the Green, and a competing defence of the book at Caen in 1978. The novel, while broad of sympathy, is hardly an unambiguous celebration of the 1916 rising, dwelling upon bloodshed, unintended consequences and the evils of romanticism, besides celebrating selfless individuals on both sides. Later, of Ian Paisley, Murdoch stated "[he] sincerely condemns violence and did not intend to incite the Protestant terrorists. That he is emotional and angry is not surprising, after 12–15 years of murderous IRA activity. All this business is deep in my soul, I'm afraid."  In private correspondence with her close friend and fellow philosopher Philippa Foot, she remarked in 1978 that she felt "unsentimental about Ireland to the point of hatred"  and, of a Franco-Irish conference she had attended in Caen in 1982, said that "the sounds of all those Irish voices made me feel privately sick. They just couldn't help sympathising with the IRA, like Americans do. A mad bad world".

Biographies and memoirs
Peter J. Conradi's 2001 biography was the fruit of long research and authorised access to journals and other papers.  It is also a labour of love, and of a friendship with Murdoch that extended from a meeting at her Gifford Lectures to her death.  The book was well received. John Updike commented: "There would be no need to complain of literary biographies [...] if they were all as good". The text addresses many popular questions about Murdoch, such as how Irish she was, what her politics were, etc.  Though not a trained philosopher, Conradi's interest in Murdoch's achievement as a thinker is evident in the biography, and yet more so in his earlier work of literary criticism The Saint and the Artist: A Study of Iris Murdoch's Works (Macmillan, 1986; HarperCollins, 2001).  He also recalled his personal encounters with Murdoch in Going Buddhist: Panic and Emptiness, the Buddha and Me. (Short Books, 2005). Conradi's archive of material on Murdoch, together with Iris Murdoch's Oxford library, is held at Kingston University.

An account of Murdoch's life with a different ambition is given by A. N. Wilson in his 2003 book Iris Murdoch as I Knew Her. The work was described by Galen Strawson in The Guardian as "mischievously revelatory" and labelled by Wilson himself as an "anti-biography". Wilson's work is an unauthorized biography.

David Morgan met Iris Murdoch in 1964, when he was a student at the Royal College of Art. His 2010 memoir With Love and Rage: A Friendship with Iris Murdoch, describes their lifelong friendship.

John Bayley wrote two memoirs of his life with Iris Murdoch. Iris: A Memoir was published in the United Kingdom in 1998, shortly before her death. The American edition, which was published in 1999, was called Elegy for Iris. A sequel entitled Iris and Her Friends was published in 1999, after her death. Murdoch was portrayed by Kate Winslet and Judi Dench in Richard Eyre's film Iris (2001), based on Bayley's memories of his wife as she developed Alzheimer's disease.

In her centenary year, 2019, a collection of unpublished memoirs was published by Sabrestorm Press entitled 'Iris Murdoch: A Centenary Celebration', edited by Miles Leeson who directs the Iris Murdoch Research Centre at the University of Chichester, UK.

Adaptations

BBC Radio 4 broadcast in 2015 an "Iris Murdoch season" with several memoirs by people who knew her, and dramatisations of her novels:
 Iris Murdoch: Dream Girl
 The Sea, the Sea
 A Severed Head

In March 2019, it was announced that the London-based award-winning production company Rebel Republic Films, led by director Garo Berberian, has optioned The Italian Girl (1964) and is currently developing a screenplay based on the book.

Bibliography

Novels
 Under the Net (1954)
 The Flight from the Enchanter (1956)
 The Sandcastle (1957)
 The Bell (1958)
 A Severed Head (1961)
 An Unofficial Rose (1962)
 The Unicorn (1963)
 The Italian Girl (1964)
 The Red and the Green (1965)
 The Time of the Angels (1966)
 The Nice and the Good (1968)
 Bruno's Dream (1969)
 A Fairly Honourable Defeat (1970)
 An Accidental Man (1971)
 The Black Prince (1973), winner of the James Tait Black Memorial Prize
 The Sacred and Profane Love Machine (1974), winner of the Whitbread literary award for Fiction
 A Word Child (1975)
 Henry and Cato (1976)
 The Sea, the Sea (1978), winner of the Booker Prize
 Nuns and Soldiers (1980)
 The Philosopher's Pupil (1983)
 The Good Apprentice (1985)
 The Book and the Brotherhood (1987)
 The Message to the Planet (1989)
 The Green Knight (1993)
 Jackson's Dilemma (1995)

Short Stories
 Something Special (1957)

Philosophy
  Sartre: Romantic Rationalist (1953)
  The Sovereignty of Good (1970)
  The Fire and the Sun (1977)
  Metaphysics as a Guide to Morals (1992) 
  Existentialists and Mystics: Writings on Philosophy and Literature (1997)

Plays
 A Severed Head (with J. B. Priestley, 1964)
 The Italian Girl (with James Saunders, 1969)
 The Three Arrows; The Servants and the Snow (1972)
 The Servants (1980)
 Acastos: Two Platonic Dialogues (1986)
 The Black Prince (1987)

Poetry collections
 A Year of Birds (1978; revised edition, 1984)
 Poems by Iris Murdoch (1997)

Source: Centre for Iris Murdoch Studies, Faculty of Arts and Social Sciences Kingston University

References

Sources

 Antonaccio, Maria (2000), Picturing the human: the moral thought of Iris Murdoch OUP. 
 Bayley, John (1999), Elegy for Iris. Picador. 
 Bayley, John (1998), Iris: A Memoir of Iris Murdoch. Gerald Duckworth & Co. Ltd. 
 Bayley, John (1999), Iris and Her Friends: A Memoir of Memory and Desire. W. W. Norton & Company  
Bove, Cheryl (1993) Understanding Iris Murdoch. Columbia, University of South Carolina Press. .
 Byatt. A.S. (1965) Degrees of Freedom: The Early Novels of Iris Murdoch. Chatto & Windus
 Conradi, P. J. (2001) Iris Murdoch: A Life.   W. W. Norton & Company 
 Conradi, P. J. (foreword by John Bayley), The Saint and the Artist. Macmillan 1986, HarperCollins 2001 
 de Melo Araújo, Sofia & Vieira, Fátima (ed.) (2011), Iris Murdoch, Philosopher Meets Novelist. Cambridge Scholars Publishing. 
Dooley, Gillian (ed.), (2003), From a Tiny Corner in the House of Fiction: Conversations With Iris Murdoch. Columbia, University of South Carolina Press 
 Laverty, Megan (2007), Iris Murdoch's Ethics: A Consideration of Her Romantic Vision. Continuum Press 
 Martens, Paul. (2012), "Iris Murdoch: Kierkegaard as Existentialist, Romantic, Hegelian, and Problematically Religious" in Kierkegaard's Influence on Philosophy. Ashgate Publishing. .
Mauri, Margarita (ed.) (2014). Ética y literatura. Cinco novelas de Iris Murdoch. Kit-book. .
 Monteleone, Ester (2012), Il Bene, l'individuo, la virtù. La filosofia morale di Iris Murdoch. Rome, Armando Editore. 
 Morgan, David (2010), With Love and Rage: A Friendship with Iris Murdoch. Kingston University Press. 
 Widdows, Heather (2005) The Moral Vision of Iris Murdoch.  Ashgate Press 
 Wilson, A. N. (2003) Iris Murdoch as I Knew Her. London, Hutchinson. 
 Wolfe, Graham (2022), "Iris Murdoch and the Immoralities of Adaptation" in Adaptation. 
 Zuba, Sonja (2009), Iris Murdoch's Contemporary Retrieval of Plato: The Influence of an Ancient Philosopher on a Modern Novelist. Lewiston, New York: Edwin Mellen Press.

External links

 The Iris Murdoch Research Centre at the University of Chichester, UK. Retrieved 10 January 2020.
 The Iris Murdoch Building at the Dementia Services Development Centre, University of Stirling . Retrieved 24 February 2010.
 The Iris Murdoch Archive, Kingston University, London. Retrieved 24 February 2010. In 2014, the Centre was given 400 letters from Murdoch to the artist Harry Weinberger, a close friend from 1977 until her death in 1999.
 Review of Conradi's Murdoch biography, The Guardian 8 September 2001. Retrieved 24 February 2010.
 Collated reviews of Conradi biography. Retrieved 24 February 2010.
 Collated reviews of AN Wilson biography. Retrieved 24 February 2010.
 A series of Iris Murdoch walks in London  Retrieved 24 February 2010.
 Galen Strawson, "Telling tales" (review of A. N. Wilson's Murdoch biography), The Guardian, 6 September 2003. Retrieved 24 February 2010.
 Matt Seaton, I'm Mr Evil (interview with biographer A. N. Wilson), The Guardian, 3 September 2003. Retrieved 24 February 2010.
 Joyce Carol Oates on Iris Murdoch
 
 Search results for "Iris Murdoch" at PhilPapers
 "Virtue Ethics", Stanford Encyclopedia of Philosophy, 18 July 2003; revised 11 October 2022.
 Portraits of Iris Murdoch at the National Portrait Gallery, London
 Graham Wolfe, "Iris Murdoch and the Immoralities of Adaptation", Adaptation, Volume 15, Issue 3, December 2022, pp. 439–455. Retrieved 8 August 2022.

1919 births
1999 deaths
20th-century atheists
20th-century British dramatists and playwrights
20th-century British non-fiction writers
20th-century British poets
20th-century British novelists
20th-century British philosophers
20th-century British women writers
20th-century Irish women writers
Alumni of Newnham College, Cambridge
Alumni of Somerville College, Oxford
Analytic philosophers
Atheist philosophers
Booker Prize winners
British atheists
British ethicists
British parodists
British people of Irish descent
British socialists
British women dramatists and playwrights
British women non-fiction writers
Communist Party of Great Britain members
Dames Commander of the Order of the British Empire
Deaths from Alzheimer's disease
Deaths from dementia in England
British LGBT novelists
British LGBT poets
British women novelists
British women philosophers
British women poets
Fellows of St Anne's College, Oxford
Fellows of the American Academy of Arts and Sciences
Historians of philosophy
James Tait Black Memorial Prize recipients
Parody novelists
People educated at Badminton School
People from Chiswick
Philosophers of culture
Philosophers of history
Philosophers of literature
Philosophy writers
Platonists
Virtue ethicists